AudioQuest is a company that was founded in 1980 by William E. Low that provides audio/video cables, digital-to-analog converters, headphones, power-conditioning products, and various audio/video accessories. The company is based in Irvine, California, has offices in the Netherlands and distributes its products to approximately 65 countries throughout the world.

History
AudioQuest's founder, William E. Low, has described himself as "an absolute hedonist." In the December 2008 issue of The Absolute Sound, Low explained to TAS's Neil Gader, "Everything I’ve learned about hi-fi or cables is purely the result of being interested in getting high on music."

In his early days of selling high-end audio equipment, William E. Low allegedly discovered that the sound of an audio system was easily influenced by the quality of the cables connecting its various components. Hi-fi journalist, Richard Hardesty explained: 
"With experimentation Bill found that better interconnect and speaker cables could make bigger audible improvements than many costly upgrades to amplifiers and speakers. And he recognized the opportunities afforded by this new category of audio components. He founded AudioQuest to explore and develop new and innovative wire, connectors and accessories."

Although AudioQuest remains best known for its analog and digital cables, the company has entered other product categories, such as the DragonFly USB digital-to-analog converter/headphone amplifier, recipient of numerous awards, including: Stereophile 's 2012 "Computer Audio Component of the Year" and 2012 "Budget Component of the Year;".

At the 2015 Consumer Electronics Show, AudioQuest entered the headphone market with its NightHawk over-the-ear headphones designed by Skylar Gray. In October 2014, NightHawk was named 2015 CES Innovation Award Honoree (Headphones) and 2015 Best of Innovation Winner (Eco-Design and Sustainable Technologies). The NightHawk was followed by the critically successful NightOwl headphone and a headphone stand called Perch.

Ethernet cable evaluation
AudioQuest sells Ethernet cables that they claim are directional, even though the concept of directional Ethernet cable goes against the Ethernet standard IEEE 802.3. Though an independent blinded ABX test of Ethernet cables at The Amazing Meeting in 2015 found that the cables do not produce a measurable effect, the experiment did not directly test for audible differences. One independent physical test of the data transmission quality of AudioQuest's Ethernet cables showed they perform no better than other class-compliant cables due to near-end crosstalk, though the testers admitted they weren't equipped to test Category 7 cables and instead tested the cable to the lower Category 6a spec. The testers also stated that in one area the AQ cable bested all other cables at the limit of cat 6 testing at the standard speed of 500 MHz while they were again unable to test to the higher cat 7 standard of 600 MHz due to lower limit of 500 MHz on the cat 6a standard test.

RCA cable evaluation
A technical review of the AudioQuest Wind RCA "PSS Silver" cable, priced $2,300, measured no advantage over a generic RCA cable, rather, the AudioQuest product had a 7 dB (118%) higher mains leakage of 60  Hz hum, plus a related elevated 3rd harmonic. This test did not directly measure audibility of any differences, however, prior research in psychoacoustics has documented that human hearing is far less sensitive than even basic electronic measurement techniques.

Power Conditioner/Surge Protector Evaluation
A technical review of the AudioQuest Niagara 1000, priced at $1,000, accompanied by two AudioQuest RG-Z3 AC power cords (total cost of the package $1,480) found the device fails to deliver any improvement in either the power delivered from its outputs or the sound produced by an audio device using that power. The reviewer stated "If you want a non-destructive surge protector, the Niagara 1200 provides that.

See also 
 High-end audio
 Stereophile
 Speaker wire
 Nordost Corporation

References

Electronics manufacturing